Gustavo Marcaccio (born 3 May 1977) is an Argentine tennis coach and former professional player.

Tennis career
Marcaccio, a native of Buenos Aires, played collegiate tennis in the United States for Arizona State University in the late 1990s, via the University of Mobile. In 1999 he was runner-up to Ryan Wolters in the Pac-10 singles championship.

While competing on the professional tour he had a career high singles ranking of 284. His best win came at the Prostejov Challenger in 2005, when he upset world number 20 Dominik Hrbatý in the first round. At ATP Tour level, Marcaccio had main draw wins over Luis Horna and Tomáš Zíb.

Coach
Marcaccio has had stints coaching his countrymen Guido Pella, Juan Mónaco and Máximo González. He was coach of Mónaco during his most successful season in 2012, when he won four ATP Tour titles, including the German Open, to break into the world's top 10.

In 2020 he coached Russian player Svetlana Kuznetsova. He then worked at Rafael Nadal Academy from April 2021 until December 2022 and as of December 2022 he coaches Rafael Nadal.

ATP Challenger and ITF Futures finals

Singles: 6 (5–1)

Doubles: 22 (13–9)

References

External links
 
 

1977 births
Living people
Argentine male tennis players
Argentine tennis coaches
Arizona State Sun Devils men's tennis players
Tennis players from Buenos Aires